Pdei L'a is a 2003 Cambodian comedy film directed by Parn Puong Bopha. The film was distributed by Angkorwat Production. It stars Sim Solika and Keo Pich Pisey.

Plot
After underestimating the effort of his wife, a husband wakes up only to find himself in the shoe of a woman. He then experiences the work, worries, and pain the average household wife usually encounters.

Cast
 Sim Solika
 Keo Pich Pisey
 Neun Chanteun
 Khieu Sompeth
 Yu Disco
 Andy
 Aok Sokun Kanha

Cambodian comedy films
2003 films
2003 comedy films